Unicorns is an upcoming drama film directed by Àlex Lora starring Greta Fernández alongside Elena Martín, Nora Navas, and Pablo Molinero.

Plot 
The life of young, polyamorous and ambitious Isa begins to crumble as, undecided about committing to a stable monogamous relationship with Guillem, she returns to her family's home with her mother.

Cast

Production 

The screenplay is a loose adaptation of Sofía Ros' novel Mi casa en llamas, which deviates from the original work in primarily focusing on the protagonist's personal transformation. It was penned by Marta Vivet, Pilar Palomero, María Mínguez and Àlex Lora. The film was produced by Inicia Films alongside Jaibo Films, with support from of TV3, IB3, ICEC, Movistar+ and Creative Europe's MEDIA. Thais Català worked as cinematographer.

Filming began in the province of Alicante, with some footage shot in Cala el Xarco (Villajoyosa), also shooting in Barcelona.

Release 
The film is distributed by Filmax. Upon the wrapping of shooting, its theatrical release in Spain was expected for 2022. The film made it to the 26th Málaga Film Festival's official selection slate. It is scheduled to be released theatrically in Spain on 19 May 2023.

See also 
 List of Spanish films of 2023

References 

Upcoming films
Spanish drama films
Films shot in the province of Alicante
Films shot in Barcelona
Catalan-language films